The University of Science and Technology - Omdurman is a non-profit organization which was founded in March 1995. The founder and chairman of the university is Elmutaz Elberier.

Foundation 

The University of Science and Technology is located in Omdurman (Standard Arabic Umm Durmān أم درمان), the largest city in Sudan and Khartoum State. It aims to expand the base of computer and applied science; starting with the faculties of information technology, computer science and computer engineering which became known as the electrical and electronic engineering faculties; with four departments (communication, medical engineering, electronic and computer engineering and computer programming).

Growth 

Then the university opened new specialties such as Medical Laboratories Science and medicine were followed by it after ten years of two programs Dentistry and Pharmacy.

The year 2001 saw the start of the architecture program and then in 2002 came the business administration program.
In 2005 another department was added to the engineering faculty which is a chemical engineering.

Faculty 
 Faculty of Medicine 
 Faculty of Dentistry
 Faculty of Pharmacy
 Faculty of Medical Laboratory Science
 Faculty of Engineering
 Faculty of Computer Science and Information Technology
 Faculty of Administrative Sciences
 Faculty of Graduate Studies

Centers

Research Centers 
 Modern Agricultural Technology Center
 ﻿UST Center For AIDS Research
 UST Center For Malaria Research
 Diseased tissue and cell center
 Center for Population and Development Studies
 Center for Omdurman Studies

Administrative Centers 
 Information Technology Center
 English Language Service Center
 E-Learning and Distance Learning Center
 Al-Barir Cultural Center

References 

Universities and colleges in Sudan